Nussu  is a village in the district Budgam, tehsil Beerwah in the Indian administered union territory of Jammu and Kashmir.

Nussu has population of shias community. The place is surrounded and famous for orchards and has largest orchards in this locality.

Demographics
In the 2011 census Iskander Pora had a population of 2,484, 1,314 males and 1168 females. The village had a sex ratio of 889 females for every 1,000 males.

Geography
It is situated at plateau-like land mass, it is surrounded by karewas on south, west and north with its east surrounded by plains.

Iskander Pora is connected with the Srinagar city via Magam town and Budgam district headquarters, Budgam, via Beerwah town. It is also connected to tehsil Khag via Malpora which is also  distant.

Mazhom Railway Station is the nearby railway stations to Magam for a person arriving from north or south.

Education

Schools
 Government Middle School, Iskander Pora] (est. 1962)
 Imamia Public High School, Iskander Pora, run and managed by Educational Trust Kashmir (ETK)

Religious education
Religious education is imparted in local maktabs. These impart education on a part-time basis to the children.
•Maktabs names

1. Maktab-e-Islamia Iskander pora Run by Al-Abbas Relief trust jk.
•Head Of Maktab Aga Syed Arshid Hussain Razvi.

2.Babul ilm Run by hauziya Babul Ilm budgam Head Of Maktab Aga Syed Hassan al- mosvi.

References

Budgam district
Villages in Budgam district